This is a list of all the amendments to the Constitution of Pakistan.

References

External links
 The Constitution of the Islamic Republic of Pakistan